Front office manager may refer to:
 a management occupation within an organization or business (see Front office)
MLB Front Office Manager, a sports-related video game